Will McIntosh (William D. McIntosh, born 31 January 1962 in New York City) is a science fiction and young adult author, a Hugo-Award-winner, and a winner or finalist for many other awards. Along with ten novels, including Defenders, Love Minus Eighty, and Burning Midnight, he has published dozens of short stories in magazines such as Asimov's Science Fiction, Strange Horizons, Lightspeed Magazine, Clarkesworld, and Interzone. His stories are frequently reprinted in different "Year's Best" anthologies.

 Life 

McIntosh attended the University of Georgia, where he received a Ph.D. in social psychology in 1990. He was a professor at Georgia Southern, where he taught psychology classes. His research focused on topics such as internet dating and romantic relationships, "happiness and goals, collecting behavior, psychological aspects of film and television, and the relationship between psychology and Zen Buddhism." In 2012, McIntosh moved to the College of William and Mary to teach introductory psychology classes and focus on his writing.

 Writing 

McIntosh attended the Clarion Workshop in 2003. McIntosh's short story "Soft Apocalypse" was shortlisted for both the British Science Fiction Award and the British Fantasy Award. His story "Bridesicle" won both the 2010 Hugo Award for Best Short Story and the 2010 Asimov's Reader Poll, along with being a finalist for that year's Nebula Award, while his story "Over There" won the 2014 Asimov's Reader Poll, and was a finalist for the Theodore Sturgeon Memorial Award in 2014.

His short story "Followed" was adapted into a film by director James Kicklighter in 2011.

Translations of McIntosh's novels have been published in China, Russia, Spain, France, Germany, Italy, Belgium, Taiwan, and Hungary.

Bibliography

 Novels 
 
 
 Love Minus Eighty (novel) Orbit Books, June 2013
 Defenders (novel) Orbit Books, May 2014
 Burning Midnight Delacorte Press, March 2016
 Faller Tor Books, October 2016
 Unbreakable Character Force, June 2017
 Watchdog Delacorte Press, October 2017
 The Future Will Be BS Free Delacorte Press, July 2018
 The Classmate Future House Publishing, March 2022

 Short fiction 

 "Work Minus Eighty", Asimov's Science Fiction, July/August 2022
 "Dollbot Cicily", Asimov's Science Fiction, March/April 2022
 "Mom Heart", Clarkesworld Magazine, November, 2021
 "Philly Killed His Car", Asimov's Science Fiction, July/Aug. 2021
 "Nic and Viv’s Compulsory Courtship", Asimov's Science Fiction, July/Aug. 2020
 "Foot Ball", Future SF, Aug. 2019
 "What Is Eve?", Lightspeed Magazine, April 2018 
 "Soulmates.com", Asimov's Science Fiction, March/April 2017
Reprinted in The Year’s Best Science Fiction and Fantasy, 2018 "Lost: Mind", Asimov's Science Fiction, July 2016
 "The Savannah Liar's Tour", Lightspeed Magazine, Jan. 2016
 "A Thousand Nights Till Morning", Asimov's Science Fiction, Aug./Sept. 2015
 "Dry Bite", Lightspeed Magazine, Sept. 2013
 "Over There", Asimov's Science Fiction, January 2013
Finalist, Theodore Sturgeon Memorial Award, 2014
 "Possible Monsters", Asimov's Science Fiction, July 2012
 "Defenders", Lightspeed Magazine, August 2011
 "Frankenstein, Frankenstein", Asimov's Science Fiction, Oct./Nov. 2010
 "Bridesicle", Asimov's Science Fiction, Jan. 2009
Winner of the 2010 Hugo Award for Best Short Story
Winner of the 2010 Asimov's Reader Poll
Finalist for the 2010 Nebula Award for Best Short Story
 "None Had Sharp Teeth", Black Static, 2009
 "Midnight Blue", Asimov's Science Fiction, Sept. 2008
Reprinted in Russian in Isli
 "A Clown Escapes from Circus Town", Interzone, Mar/April 2009
 "Street Hero", Interzone, Mar/April 2008
 "Linkworlds", Strange Horizons, March 2008
Reprinted in Unplugged: The Year's Best Online Fiction, 2009 "The Fantasy Jumper", Black Static, Feb., 2008
Reprinted in Science Fiction:  Best of the Year 2009 "Unlikely", Asimov's Science Fiction, Jan. 2008
Reprinted in New Horizons #1, Isli (Russian), Sci Fi Magazin,(Romania), Galaxies, (France)
 "One Paper Airplane Graffito Love Note", Strange Horizons, Oct. 2007
 "Dada Jihad", Interzone, Sept/Oct 2007
 "3 Unlikely Futures", Postscripts, Autumn, 2007
 "Perfect Violet", On Spec, Summer, 2007
Reprinted in Science Fiction:  Best of the Year 2008 "The New Chinese Wives", Interzone, Sept/Oct 2006
 "The Last Cyberpunk", Andromeda Spaceways Inflight Magazine, Issue 22, 2006
 "Followed", Lady Churchill's Rosebud Wristlet, June, 2006
Reprinted in The Living Dead, John Joseph Adams, editor, 2008
 "Best Friend", ChiZine, Jan-March 2006
 "Friction", Albedo One, Issue 29
 "New Spectacles", Abyss & ApexReprinted in The Best of Abyss & Apex "Totems", Interzone, Jan/Feb 2005
 "Soft Apocalypse", Interzone, Sept/Oct 2005
Finalist for the 2005 British Science Fiction Award and the 2005 British Fantasy Award
 Reprinted in Galaxies (France)
 "Under the Boardwalk", Andromeda Spaceways Inflight Magazine'', Issue 19, 2005

References

External links
 Will McIntosh official website
 
 Hugo Award interview with Will McIntosh 
 PDF of McIntosh's Hugo Award winning short story, "Bridesicle" 
 Story behind Love Minus Eighty - essay 

21st-century American novelists
American male novelists
American science fiction writers
Living people
1962 births
Hugo Award-winning writers
University of Georgia alumni
Georgia Southern University faculty
American male short story writers
Asimov's Science Fiction people
21st-century American short story writers
21st-century American male writers